Amazon Freevee is an American ad-supported streaming service owned by Amazon, previously branded as IMDb TV.

Original programming

Drama

Comedy

Adult animation

Non-English language scripted

Unscripted

Docuseries

Reality

Exclusive international distribution/Co-productions

These shows have been acquired and co-produced, partly or wholly, by Amazon Freevee for exclusive first-run release in the United States in deals with partners in other regions.

Drama

Comedy

Animation

Adult animation

Feature films

Upcoming original programming

Drama

Comedy

Unscripted

Docuseries

Reality

Continuations
These shows have been picked up by Amazon Freevee for additional seasons after having aired previous seasons on another network.

Exclusive international distribution/Co-productions

In development

Notes

References 

Amazon Freevee
Amazon Freevee
Amazon Freevee
Amazon (company)